Jennifer Bowes is a Canadian politician, who was elected to the Legislative Assembly of Saskatchewan in the 2020 Saskatchewan general election. She represents the electoral district of Saskatoon University as a member of the Saskatchewan New Democratic Party caucus.

Political career 
Bowes first ran for provincial office in the 2016 election in the newly created riding of Saskatoon University. There she finished second to Saskatchewan Party candidate and former Saskatoon City Councillor Eric Olauson by a margin of 348 votes.

Bowes ran again in the 2020 election, challenging the incumbent Olauson and winning the seat by a margin of 495 votes.

In November 2020, Bowes was named NDP critic for Advanced Education, Innovation, and the Status of Women. Bowes was also named the associate critic for Labour and the Opposition Deputy Whip.

Personal life 
Bowes was born in Saskatoon and raised in Waldheim, Saskatchewan. She earned a bachelor's degree in Psychology from Queen's University in Kingston, Ontario.

After graduating, Bowes worked with the Saskatchewan Ministries of Corrections and Social Services, and was elected vice president of the Elizabeth Fry Society. She also spent time working in Myanmar with CUSO International, before returning to Saskatoon and working as a labour organizer for healthcare workers with SEIU West.

Electoral results

References

Living people
21st-century Canadian women politicians
Saskatchewan New Democratic Party MLAs
Women MLAs in Saskatchewan
Politicians from Saskatoon
Year of birth missing (living people)